The 1954 Brisbane Rugby League premiership was the 46th season of Brisbane's semi-professional rugby league football competition. The season culminated in Western Suburbs defeating Past Brothers 35–18 in the first grade grand final.

Table

Finals

Grand Final 
Western Suburbs 35 (Tries: Meredith 2, Watson 2, McIntosh, Bishop, McCrohon. Goals: Watson 4, McCrohon 3)

Past Brothers 18 (Tries: Proberts, O'Malley, Craven, Otago. Goals: Dall 3)

References

Rugby league in Brisbane
Brisbane Rugby League season